iSpeed is a steel roller coaster at Mirabilandia in Italy. It opened on May 20, 2009, and is the second blitz coaster to be made by Intamin following Maverick at Cedar Point in Sandusky, Ohio.

The ride

The coaster starts with a 68 MPH launch in 2.2 seconds into a top hat where it climbs to 180 feet and then plummets to the ground. Following this is a barrage of airtime hills, tight turns, and inversions.

Maintenance
Throughout the ride in certain spots copper alloy fins are placed to create a magnetic field and regulate the coasters speed.

References

Roller coasters in Italy
Roller coasters introduced in 2009